The honeyguide greenbul (Baeopogon indicator) is a species of songbird in the bulbul family, Pycnonotidae.
It is widespread throughout the African tropical rainforest.

Taxonomy and systematics
The honeyguide greenbul was originally described in the genus Criniger and was later re-classified to the genus Baeopogon.  Alternate names for the honeyguide greenbul include the honeyguide bulbul and white-tailed greenbul. The latter name is also used as an alternate name by Sjöstedt's greenbul and the swamp palm bulbul.

Subspecies
Two subspecies of the honeyguide greenbul are recognized:
 Upper Guinea honeyguide greenbul (B. i. leucurus) - (Cassin, 1855): Originally described as a separate species in the genus Trichophorus (a synonym for Criniger). Found from Sierra Leone to Togo
 Uganda honeyguide greenbul (B. i. indicator) - (Verreaux, J & Verreaux, E, 1855): Found from Nigeria to southern Sudan and western Kenya, southern Democratic Republic of the Congo, north-western Zambia and northern Angola

References

Baeopogon
Birds described in 1855
Taxonomy articles created by Polbot